Dane Elkins (born 1999) is a professional racquetball player. He holds 23 major national junior racquetball championships (12 world outdoor racquetball championships, 8 USA National Junior Indoor Championships (including 6 titles at Jr. Olympics), and 3 USA National High School Championships). He is also the 2017 National Paddleball Association-(NPA) Junior's 18-and-under National Champion. Elkins holds a black belt in taekwondo.

Elkins is the second person in USA Racquetball history, male or female, to win all three number one gold divisions (singles, doubles, and mixed) at the USA Racquetball National High School Championships, and was featured in the Los Angeles Times for his accomplishments. Also, more recently (for the same distinction) in the May 28, 2017, issue of  'Sports Illustrated'.  His singles title earned him a spot on the 2017/18 USA Jr. National Racquetball Team.

Elkins is an eight-time member of the USA National Junior Racquetball Team (indoor and outdoor), a six-time USA Racquetball "All American," a three-time USA Jr. Olympic "All American," a three-time USA Racquetball High School "All American," and a two-time USA National Singles Champion (Boys' Division, 14 and 18). He is currently ranked 33rd on the International Racquetball Tour (IRT)) — the largest and best known professional racquetball tour.

Although still seeking his 1st Tier 1 win on the IRT - Elkins holds an exceptional USAR National Singles Ranking of 385.

Early and personal life
Elkins is a member of University Synagogue in Los Angeles, California. He lives in Brentwood, California. His father, Brett Elkins, is a world outdoor skills three-wall champion (2012), ranked IRT pro, and head of the World Outdoor Racquetball Hall of Fame.

His younger brother, Cody Elkins, in 2015 was ranked 2nd nationally in racquetball for boys 10-and-under, finished 3rd in boys 10 and under at the 2014 Junior Olympics, and finished 2nd in boys mixed and boys 10 doubles in 2015. In 2017, Cody won 2 gold medals at the Junior World (WOR) Outdoor Racquetball Championships in boys 14 and 16 singles; he won a gold medal in 14 and under mixed doubles racquetball at the 2018 Junior Olympics with Camilla Gomez and in 2019 he won the USA NPA National Junior Singles Paddleball Championships for his age. Cody Elkins is sponsored by the clothing company, Splathead.

In June 2016, Elkins received a black belt in martial arts from five-time world champion instructor Keith Hirabayashi Cooke (Keith Cooke). He attended Santa Monica College
and then University of California, Santa Cruz, for its Electrical Engineering program. He joined John Bardos as part of the UC Santa Cruz Racquetball Team. He graduated from Palisades Charter High School in Pacific Palisades, California.

Missing Person, 2020-Present

Dane Elkins has been missing since December 21, 2020.

The 21-year-old UC Santa Cruz student’s last known location was near Interstate 5 and Templin Highway in the area of Castaic, California, around 8:20 p.m., where his car was found abandoned with a flat tire, according to the Los Angeles Police Department.

Racquetball

In 2011, Elkins won a full scholarship from the International Racquetball Tour (IRT) pro racquetball Network /USA Racquetball (USAR) team to attend the United States Olympic Committee (USOC) Olympic Training Seminar in Colorado Springs, Colorado.

2013

In July 2013 at the 45th annual WOR Championships, Elkins made the national outdoor team in singles and doubles.

2014

At the 2014 Wilson Junior Olympics (indoor racquetball) in Denver, Colorado, Elkins won the gold medal in 14-and-under boys doubles with partner Ricardo Diaz. He also won the gold medal for 14-and-under mixed doubles with partner Atossa Rejaei.

Elkins made the 2014 USA Junior National Team (indoor racquetball) and played at the World Championships in Cali, Colombia, representing Team USA in October 2014. The USA Jr. National Team finished third overall, receiving a bronze medal. Elkins and partner Ricky Diaz, at the 2014 World Jr. Championships, lost in the quarterfinals in doubles (in a tiebreaker) to the team that silver-medaled.

In 2014, at the 47th annual USA Racquetball National Singles Championship (indoor) in Fullerton, California, Elkins won the gold medal in the boy's 14-and-under and boys 18-and-under (as a 14-year-old). In July 2014 and August 2016, Elkins again attended the USOC Olympic Training Camp.

Elkins won his first professional match in 2014 in Fresno, California, at age 15; he has now played several top 20 professional players and has placed in the finals, semifinals, and quarterfinals at several IRT pro racquetball tour events.

2015

Since 2015, Elkins has served as a junior board member for the California-Nevada State Racquetball Association (CNRA). He and several local southern California players have raised several thousand dollars in CNRA fundraisers for Jr. Olympics and World Championships. Elkins is the founding member and original president (he now shares that title with high school doubles’ partner Jared Anwar) of the Palisades Charter High School Racquetball Team that represented California at the 2014, 2015, 2016, and 2017 USA National High School Championship held in Oregon (2014 and 2016) and Missouri (2015 and 2017).

2016

In 2016, Elkins won the Junior Olympic Nationals Championships in the boys' Gold 16 and under doubles, earning him the sport's top honor again—a coveted spot on the USA Jr. National Racquetball (indoor) Team.

At the 2016 Junior National Championships, Elkins' longtime partner, Ricky Diaz, played on a fractured ankle in their semi and finals doubles championship victories to qualify them for the World Championships in November 2016 in San Luis Portosi, Mexico, and play for the 2016 USA Jr. National Team.

At the 2016 World Jr. Championships, Elkins had his best showing as a two-time quarter-finalist in singles and doubles (his USA team won two bronze medals - in overall and boys). As a National Outdoor USA Team member, Elkins has achieved outdoor racquetball #1 world ranking (in singles and doubles 2011 and 2013) four times.

Dane is sponsored by the stringing company, Ashaway, and coached at national pro/junior events by six-time #1 pro player/coach Cliff Swain.

2017

In March 2017, he became only the second player in US history to win the top singles (defeating Cayden Akins of Texas, 15-2, 15-2), doubles, and mixed doubles titles at the USA Racquetball National High School Championships, in St. Louis. With those victories, he had won 21 major national championship junior titles. He was ranked Number 35 on the International Racquetball Pro Tour, the highest ranking for anybody 17 years old or younger. Later that month, he won the Boys 18s singles division. He also won the gold medal in the 18-and-under mixed doubles division with Elena Dent.

Dane was invited to play for Team USA at the 2017 Junior World Championships (he had been the first official alternate designee by winning the USA High School Singles title after Wayne Antone, the under-18 national champ, was unable to go). Dane won several matches at Jr. Worlds in pool play and defeated the number one player (Acuna) in his bracket. At Jr. Worlds, Dane made the quarterfinals in singles and contributed to a 3d place Team USA overall finish.

In June 2018, Dane was named the 2017 Palisades Charter High School's "Top Male Athlete or ‘Cup’ award winner," which is voted on by the Palisadean Post private newspaper. [Dane's selection caused some controversy because Dane had not officially played a Los Angeles Unified School District (LAUSD)-sanctioned high school sport although he did play in USA Racquetball-sanctioned high school championships. Sports Editor Steve Galluzzo (and others at the newspaper) felt Dane's high school accomplishments were superlative compared with other Palisades CHS (Pali High) LAUSD-sanctioned sports' athletes and chose him for the award. Dane is believed to be the first Pali High athlete in the school's history to win this award without playing a varsity sport at Pali High.]

2018
In January 2018, the California-Nevada State Racquetball Association (CSRA) held a highly unusual State Juniors Championship featuring $1200 in prize money for the 18-and-younger singles’ divisions to entice the top CA Juniors to play since most are professionals and few play it. The highly regarded non-profit organization Reaching Your Dream Foundation (RYD) and Michael Lippitt funded the prize money for the event. Dane competed against 5 top USA National Team Members including partner Ricky Diaz, Julian Singh, Krish and Salil Thakur, and Antonio Rojas. Dane won the $500 first-place 18-and-younger prize. [This is one of many CA State Jr. titles for Dane, including one a few years earlier when he broke his right hand and won the CA State championships as a lefty even though he is not ambidextrous.]

In June 2018, Dane had his best showing ever at the Junior Olympics winning the 18-and-under Gold Doubles (top divisions) with Ricardo Diaz in their final season together as juniors. Dane also won Gold Mixed 18-and-under doubles with first-time participant Taylor Shaw. Dane lost in the finals of the boys’ gold 18-and-under singles to partner Ricardo Diaz and thus qualified for the USA team in singles and doubles.

At the World Junior Championships held in San Luis Potosi, Mexico, Dane lost a tiebreaker to the number-1 seed from Bolivia and finished 3d place in doubles with Ricardo Diaz; Dane also made the quarters in singles. Team USA took a bronze at Jr. Worlds.

2019
In January 2019, at a tier-1 IRT pro stop held in Canoga Park, California, in Open Divisions’ play, Dane beat Justus Benson, a player seeded #3 on the World Racquetball Tour (WRT) pro tour event.

Features

Elkins was featured on the Palisadean Post Sports Page on June 28, 2016. He was also featured, along with several other acclaimed athletes from the Pacific Palisades, in a December 24, 2015, article in the Palisadian-Post, "Top Athletes of the Year in 2015."

In the Spring 2014 edition of USA Racquetball, Elkins contributed an article on the January 2014 California-Nevada junior racquetball championships.

Elkins authored the article "2015 California-Nevada State Junior Racquetball Championships (Southern California)" published on the California-Nevada Racquetball website. He also co-wrote the article, "California Divides with Awesome Results," in the Spring 2012 issue of USA Racquetball Magazine.

Highlights
Elkins was interviewed by the Palisadian Post following the Junior World Championships held in Cali, Colombia. Elkins and his teammates brought home the Bronze Medal for Team USA.

Elkins defeated Lucas Shoemaker at the 2015 Jr Olympics, boys 16 gold division.

The 2016 National Olympic Junior Championships, boys 16 gold division doubles, featured their Championships match on USA Racquetball National Streaming. Elkins and Ricky Diaz defeated Mitch Turner (Oregon) and Julian Singh (California) to make the USA National Jr. Team.

References 

Living people
American racquetball players
Jewish American sportspeople
People from Brentwood, Los Angeles
Sportspeople from Los Angeles
1999 births
21st-century American Jews